Carlton is an unincorporated place in Rosthern Rural Municipality No. 403, Saskatchewan, Canada. The place is located on Highway 683, approximately 20 km north-west of Rosthern.

Attractions

Fort Carlton Provincial Historic Park

The original site of Fort Carlton is located approximately 5 km north-west of Carlton along the banks of the North Saskatchewan River. The fort was originally established as a Hudson's Bay Company fur trading post that operated between 1810 until 1885. The fort has been rebuilt by the Government of Saskatchewan and is now known as a Provincial Park of Saskatchewan and is a popular attraction located along the original Carlton Trail.

Carlton Trail

The Carlton Trail was the primary land transportation route connecting the various parts of the Canadian Northwest for most of the 19th century. It stretched from the Red River Colony up to what is today Fort Qu'Appelle, Saskatchewan via Fort Ellice. From here the trail ran north and crossed the South Saskatchewan River near Batoche, Saskatchewan until it reached Fort Carlton on the North Saskatchewan River. After this point the trail ran due west along the river to Fort Edmonton at what is now Edmonton, Alberta. The distance in total the trail traveled between Fort Garry (Winnipeg) to Upper Fort des Prairies (Edmonton) was approximately 900 miles (1,500 kilometers). Many smaller trails jutted off from the main trail, such as the Fort à la Corne Trail in the Saskatchewan Valley. Today the Trail has been designated as a National Historic Site of Canada and portions of the original Trail can still be seen.

See also

 Fort Carlton
 List of communities in Saskatchewan
 Hamlets of Saskatchewan

References

External links
Fort Carlton Provincial Park

Rosthern No. 403, Saskatchewan
Populated places established in 1910
Unincorporated communities in Saskatchewan
Ghost towns in Saskatchewan
Division No. 15, Saskatchewan